Nieboczowy  (German Niebotschau) is a village in the administrative district of Gmina Lubomia, within Wodzisław County, Silesian Voivodeship, in southern Poland.

The original village with 550 inhabitants was demolished between 2013 and 2017 due to the construction of the Racibórz Dolny polder. A new village was built near the village of Syrynia.

References

Nieboczowy